George Barbour (1615 – 1685) represented Medfield, Massachusetts in the Great and General Court of Massachusetts. He was a signer of the Dedham Covenant.

References

Works cited

1615 births
1685 deaths
people from Medfield, Massachusetts
People from colonial Dedham, Massachusetts
Signers of the Dedham Covenant
Members of the Massachusetts General Court
Kingdom of England emigrants to Massachusetts Bay Colony